Eagle Academy is an alternative high school in Eagle, Idaho, United States.

References

Public high schools in Idaho
Schools in Ada County, Idaho
1998 establishments in Idaho